Acacia tetraptera is a shrub of the genus Acacia and the subgenus Phyllodineae. It is native to an area in the  southern Wheatbelt  and Goldfields-Esperance regions of Western Australia.

It blooms from August to September and produces yellow flowers.

See also
List of Acacia species

References

tetraptera
Acacias of Western Australia
Taxa named by Bruce Maslin